Studyportals B.V. is an Eindhoven-based company involved in providing an online education choice platform, listing more than 200,000 undergraduate, postgraduate, distance learning, preparation course programmes worldwide, along with other international education resources. They also have a scholarship listing portal, called Scholarshipportal, enabling students to search for scholarship options from institutions and organizations around the world. The company initially started out as Mastersportal at the end of 2007, and has since expanded to Bachelorsportal, Mastersportal, PhDportal, Distancelearningportal and Shortcoursesportal. Besides more than 3,750 participating universities, Studyportals is cooperating with and supported by the European Commission and other national higher education institutes such as DAAD (Germany), Nuffic (Netherlands) and the British Council (UK). Studyportals has been part of several EU-funded projects in the field of higher education and regularly publishes reports about developments on the European higher education sector. According to their website, Studyportals has more than 36 million visitors per year.

History

Mastersportal (which would later form the basis for Studyportals) started in 2007 as a spin-off from the international student organisation ESTIEM. Their members identified a massive information gap, wherein students struggled to find English-taught Master's degree options in Europe. This informational gap that was especially pronounced following the Bologna Process - a process that resulted in a unification of higher education throughout Europe. In 2009 Studyportals B.V. was officially founded, undergoing several processes of professionalization. In the same year, they won the Dutch New Venture award and managed to secure start-up venture capital.

Over the years, Studyportals continued to adjusted its business and marketing model. In 2011, Studyportals changed its university advertising model, one largely based upon a results-based system. By 2013, Studyportals defined its mission and core values, enabling them to hire colleagues and brand the company according to specific principles, values, and ideals.

In the years that followed, the company's platform continued to increase its popularity, becoming the European market leader for English-taught Masters's programmes in 2009. As of October 2017, the company had over 180 employees, with offices in Bucharest, Boston, Melbourne, Manchester, Monterrey and while maintaining headquarters in Eindhoven.

Owned websites

Currently Studyportals is the owner of the following websites:

Bachelorsportal: Information about Bachelor's programmes worldwide (B.A., B.Sc., BBA, LL.B.)
Mastersportal: Information about Master's programmes worldwide (M.A., M.Sc., MBA, LL.M)
PhDportal: Information about Ph.D. opportunities worldwide (Ph.D. D.B.A.)
DistanceLearningportal: Information about open and distance learning worldwide
ShortCoursesportal: Information about short courses worldwide (including summer and winter schools)
Scholarshipportal: Information about scholarships worldwide
AdmissionTestportal: Information about IELTS test dates, locations and fees

The Global Study Awards

In 2015 Studyportals, in cooperation with the ISIC Association and British Council launched The Global Study Awards. The award was introduced in order to support students who are interested in studying abroad and exploring new countries. Every year, applications for The Global Study Awards undergo 4 rounds of selection before two recipients are chosen at the final rounds. Eligible participants have the chance receive an award up to £10,000 that can be applied towards tuition fees, paid directly to the Higher Education Institution.

According to the ISIC Association, British Council, and Studyportals, they select candidates based on their "potential to contribute to society through their studies," their "commitment to developing their career", and their "sincere interest in increasing intercultural understanding and exchange".

The League of Students 
In 2016, Studyportals created the League of Students. This project is designed in order to create a community of international student ambassadors. These ambassadors are students who are enrolled at one of the top 500 universities in Europe, allowing them to represent Studyportals at their respective universities. Participating ambassadors write blogs, create videos, give tours of their universities, assist fellow students through Skype, and promote studying abroad through social media.

Each activity that an ambassador performs comes with a set of points he or she can receive. After a certain number of points, students are given a symbolic laurel along with a gift. Some students are even eligible for taking a Studyportals Road Trip.

In 2017, the League of Student Ambassadors held their first road trip, in which four ambassadors travelled to 5 cities around Europe as a reward for collecting points.

Analytics & Consulting Team (ACT) 
In 2015, Studyportals formed a data-driven consultancy team within the company. The Analytics & Consulting Team (ACT), offers comprehensive, data-driven research to universities worldwide; through market analyses, training, and insights, the ACT team is able to assist universities with student recruitment and international education.

Awards

In 2009 Studyportals won the New Venture award as most promising innovative and social start-up in the Netherlands.

In 2013 CEO and co-founder Edwin van Rest received the EAIE Rising Star Award for his notable contribution to international education.

In 2014 Studyportals won the FD Gazellen Award for best International growth achievement in the Netherlands. The company was also honored as one of the fasted growing technology companies within the BENELUX during the Deloitte Fast50 Awards, having occupied place 7. With this result the study choice platform has also qualified for the international pendant, the Deloitte Fast500 EMEA, ending up on place 54 in this ranking.

In 2015 Studyportals was again awarded for the Deloitte Fast50 Awards.

In 2016, Studyportals won EdTechXGlobal All Stars Growth Award. They also the FD Gazellen Award (for the third year in a row), and Studyportals CEO Edwin van Rest won the High Tech Peak Award.

In 2017, Financial Times recognized Studyportals among Europe's fastest growing companies.

Publications

 English Language Masters Briefing Paper (2013)
 Key influencers of international student satisfaction in Europe (2013)
 Annual Study in Europe Interest Monitor (2013)
 New routes to higher education: the global rise of foundation programmes (2015)
 CRM Systems in Higher Education (2015)
 Impact of Distance Education on Adult Learning (2015)
 World's Top Universities Through Student Eyes (2015) 
 International Students' Study Choice Patterns (2015)
 Selling Higher Education: From Enquiries to Enrolment (2016)
 Routes to Higher Education: the global shape of pathway programmes (2016)
 2017 Trends in International Student Recruitment (2017)
 Asia Rising: The State of International Education (2017)
 English-taught Bachelor's programmes: internationalising European Higher Education (2017)
 Location, location, location: the importance of segmentation by city (2017)

References

External links 

2007 establishments in the Netherlands
Education companies established in 2007
Companies based in North Brabant
Companies of the Netherlands
Education companies
Educational organisations based in the Netherlands